Aldred syndrome is an X-linked recessive genetic disorder. It is mainly characterized by a form of mental retardation and retinitis pigmentosa. The syndrome was first described by geneticist Micheala Aldred in 1994.

Cause 
Aldred syndrome is caused by a deletion on the p11.3 area of the X-chromosome.

References

External links

X-linked recessive disorders